Walter Waldemar Wallberg (born 24 March 2000) is a Swedish freestyle skier. He competed in the 2018 Winter Olympics. He won gold in the Beijing 2022 Winter Olympics men's moguls with a score of 83.23.

References

2000 births
Living people
Freestyle skiers at the 2018 Winter Olympics
Freestyle skiers at the 2022 Winter Olympics
Swedish male freestyle skiers
Olympic freestyle skiers of Sweden
Olympic medalists in freestyle skiing
Olympic gold medalists for Sweden
Medalists at the 2022 Winter Olympics
People from Bollnäs
Sportspeople from Gävleborg County
21st-century Swedish people